White Badge is a 1992 South Korean war film directed by Chung Ji-young based on the book White Badge: A Novel of Korea by Ahn Jung-hyo.

It depicts the experience of South Korean soldiers who fought in the Vietnam War alongside American troops.  White Badge follows the path of two South Korean soldiers as they struggle to deal with their experiences in the Vietnam War.

Plot summary
Kiju Han, a journalist, must face his memories of Vietnam as he writes a series of articles on the subject for his local newspaper.  The articles attract a fellow veteran, Chinsu Pyeon, who begins randomly appearing in Han's life.  The film, through a series of flashbacks, depicts both the events in Vietnam and their aftermath in the lives of these two soldiers.

External links
 

1992 films
1990s war drama films
South Korean war drama films
Vietnam War films
Films about writers
Films based on Korean novels
Films based on military novels
Films directed by Chung Ji-young
1990s Korean-language films
1992 drama films